The following is the discography of MC Lyte, an American hip hop musician.

MC Lyte began her recording career in 1987 with "I Cram to Understand U (Sam)". In 1988, her collaboration with Sinéad O'Connor on "I Want Your (Hands on Me)" became her first single to reach the charts, appearing in England and New Zealand hit lists. That same year with her debut album Lyte as a Rock Lyte became the first woman to release a full-length Rap album as a solo artist. On October 21, 1989, her second album Eyes on This became the first by a female solo rapper to appear on the Billboard 200 (then called Billboard Top Pop Albums), on which it remained for 20 weeks, peaking  86 in November. It also peaking  6 on the Billboard Top Black Albums, the MC Lyte's highest position on this chart, as well as her first and only top 10 appearance. In December of the same year, she became the first woman to reach number one on the Billboard Rap Songs as lead artist with "Cha Cha Cha". In March 1992 "Poor Georgie" became her first song to chart on the Billboard 200. On November 30, 1993 "Ruffneck" became the first work by a female solo rapper to be certified gold by the RIAA. In September 1996 her fourth album Bad as I Wanna B peaked at No. 59 on the Billboard 200, the MC Lyte's highest position on this chart. In Germany, the album reached No. 95 on the Offizielle Top 100, becoming MC Lyte's first studio album to chart outside of the United States. Lyte's sixth studio album, Seven & Seven (1998), failed to chart on the Billboard main chart, as did their subsequent release Da Undaground Heat, Vol. 1 (2003), which was released independently. In September 2001 he published his first compilation album The Very Best of MC Lyte. In May 2008 he published an EP as part of the group The Almost September. In April 2015, more than 8 years after the release of his last solo studio album, MC Lyte publishes Legend.

In total 5 Lyte songs (4 as the main artist and one as part of the Stop the Violence Movement) would reach number one on Billboard Rap Songs and hold seven entries on the Billboard 200, reaching the top 10 with their collaboration on Janet Jackson's "You Want This" (number 8) and "Keep On Keepin' On" (number 10). Internationally, her most successful single in terms of commercial performance is arguably "Cold Rock a Party" (1996), which was certified platinum in New Zealand.

Albums

Studio albums

Compilation albums

Soundtracks albums

Remix albums

EPs

Singles

As lead artist

B-sides

Featured singles

Promotional singles

Guest appearances

Videography

Video albums

Music videos

As lead artist

As featured artist

Soundtrack

References

Notes

Citations

Hip hop discographies
Discographies of American artists